Ana Pérez Campos (born December 14, 1997) is a Spanish female artistic gymnast and a member of the national team. She participated at the 2015 World Artistic Gymnastics Championships in Glasgow,
 and eventually qualified for the 2016 Summer Olympics, finishing thirty-sixth in the preliminary phase of the competition with a total score of 54.299.

Pérez won all-around and team bronze medals at the 2018 Mediterranean Games.

Personal life
Pérez is the cousin of the Spanish footballer Dani Pérez.

See also
List of Olympic female artistic gymnasts for Spain

References

External links
 
 
 
 
 

1997 births
Living people
Spanish female artistic gymnasts
Sportspeople from Seville
Gymnasts at the 2016 Summer Olympics
Olympic gymnasts of Spain
Mediterranean Games bronze medalists for Spain
Mediterranean Games medalists in gymnastics
Competitors at the 2018 Mediterranean Games
21st-century Spanish women